Matthews Peak is a prominent peak, rising to  northwest of Statham Peak in the southwest part of Perplex Ridge, Pourquoi Pas Island, in Marguerite Bay, Antarctica. It was named by the UK Antarctic Place-Names Committee in 1979 after David W. Matthews, a British Antarctic Survey geologist on Stonington Island, 1965–67, who worked in the area.

References

Mountains of Graham Land
Fallières Coast